Cossula is a genus of moths in the family Cossidae.

Species
 Cossula albicosta Schaus, 1911
 Cossula alboperlata Bryk, 1953
 Cossula ardosiata Dognin, 1916
 Cossula arpi Schaus, 1901
 Cossula buspina Davis, Gentili-Poole & Mitter, 2008
 Cossula coerulescens Schaus, 1911
 Cossula cossuloides (Schaus, 1911)
 Cossula duplex Dyar, 1937
 Cossula duplexata Davis, Gentili-Poole & Mitter, 2008
 Cossula gaudeator (Schaus, 1911)
 Cossula longirostrum Davis, Gentili-Poole & Mitter, 2008
 Cossula magna Schaus, 1905
 Cossula magnifica Strecker, 1876
 Cossula minutiloba Davis, Gentili-Poole & Mitter, 2008
 Cossula oletta Dyar, 1937
 Cossula omaia Schaus
 Cossula poecilosema Clench, 1961
 Cossula stoica Dognin, 1922
 Cossula tapajoza Dyar, 1937
 Cossula wellingi Clench, 1961

Former species
 Cossula bistellata Dognin, 1910
 Cossula eberti Clench, 1961
 Cossula interrogationis Dyar, 1937
 Cossula morgani Clench, 1957
 Cossula nigripuncta Dognin, 1916
 Cossula notodontoides Schaus, 1892
 Cossula praeclara Schaus, 1892

References

 , 2008, Zoological Journal of the Linnean Society 154: 222-277.
 , 1990: A Phylogenetic study on Cossidae (Lepidoptera: Ditrysia) based on external adult morphology. Zoologische Verhandelingen 263: 1-295. Full article: .

External links
Natural History Museum Lepidoptera generic names catalog

Cossulinae
Moth genera